Lee Jung-hoo (born August 20, 1998) is a South Korean outfielder who plays for the Kiwoom Heroes of the KBO League.

He is the son of former KBO League MVP Lee Jong-beom. nicknamed "Son of the Wind," so he is called "Grandson of the Wind."

Professional career
In a profile of his father when Lee Jung-hoo was seven years old, he was already attracting attention for his devotion to baseball and his skill at the game.
 
Lee was selected by the Nexen Heroes in the 2017 Draft (held in 2016), as an infielder. Following a great spring training, Lee was included on the team's opening day roster at age 18 without going through the KBO Futures League. Converted to an outfielder, Lee became the first rookie out of high school to appear in every game for a KBO team. He finished the season batting .324/.395/.417 with 2 home runs, 47 RBIs, 12 stolen bases, and 179 hits, which set a new rookie record for hits. At the conclusion of the season, Lee was voted KBO League Rookie of the Year.

In 2018, he batted .355/.412/.477. In 2019 he batted .336/.386/.456.

In 2019, he won series MVP in the playoffs. His father, Lee Jong-beom, won the MVP award in the 1993 Korean Series, with a batting average of .313 (9 hits in 29 at-bats) and three steals, the most in a game. With Lee Jung-hoo's selection, it became the first time in the KBO that both father and son won a postseason MVP award.

Lee won another Golden Glove Award in 2020 with a batting line of .333, 15 home runs, 101 RBI, and a career-high OPS of .921.

In the 2022 season, Lee won the KBO League Most Valuable Player Award.

International career
He represented South Korea at the 2018 Asian Games. He delivered the winning RBI against Chinese Taipei on November 17.
He played for Team Korea at the 2019 WBSC Premier12 tournament, and led the tournament with five doubles.
He represented South Korea at the Tokyo 2020 Olympics.

References

External links 

 

1998 births
Living people
Baseball players at the 2018 Asian Games
Baseball players at the 2020 Summer Olympics
2023 World Baseball Classic players
Asian Games gold medalists for South Korea
Medalists at the 2018 Asian Games
Asian Games medalists in baseball
KBO League outfielders
KBO League Rookie of the Year Award winners
Kiwoom Heroes players
Baseball people from Nagoya
Olympic baseball players of South Korea